This article details the Catalans Dragons rugby league football club's 2010 season. This is their 5th season in the Super League.

Table

Milestones

Round 1: Setaimata Sa, Dallas Johnson and Chris Walker made their debuts for the Dragons.
Round 1: Chris Walker scored his 1st try for the Dragons.
Round 1: Chris Walker kicked his 1st goal for the Dragons.
Round 2: William Barthau made his debut for the Dragons.
Round 3: Setaimata Sa scored his 1st try for the Dragons.
Round 5: Olivier Elima made his 50th appearance for the Dragons.
Round 7: David Guasch and Tony Gigot made their debuts for the Dragons.
Round 9: Frédéric Vaccari and Mickaël Simon made their debuts for the Dragons.
Round 9: William Barthau kicked his 1st goal for the Dragons.
Round 10: Dallas Johnson scored his 1st try for the Dragons.
Round 11: Frédéric Vaccari scored his 1st try for the Dragons.
Round 11: Grégory Mounis reached 100 points for the Dragons.
Round 11: Thomas Bosc reached 700 points for the Dragons.
CCR4: Casey McGuire scored his 25th try and reached 100 points for the Dragons.
CCR5: Thomas Bosc made his 100th appearance for the Dragons.
CCR5: Setaimata Sa scored his 1st hat-trick for the Dragons.
Round 15: Brent Sherwin made his debut for the Dragons.
CCQF: Tony Gigot scored his 1st try for the Dragons.
CCQF: Thomas Bosc kicked his 300th goal for the Dragons.
Round 21: Brent Sherwin scored his 1st try for the Dragons.
Round 21: Clint Greenshields scored his 50th try and reached 200 points for the Dragons.
Round 22: Clint Greenshields made his 100th appearance for the Dragons.
Round 23: Thomas Bosc reached 800 points for the Dragons.
Round 23: Brent Sherwin kicked his 1st drop goal for the Dragons.
CCSF: Rémi Casty made his 100th appearance for the Dragons.
Round 27: Tony Gigot kicked his 1st goal for the Dragons.

Pre-season friendlies

Dragons score is first.

Fixtures and results

2010 Super League

Player appearances
Super League only

 = Injured

 = Suspended

Challenge Cup

Player appearances
Challenge Cup games only

 = Injured

 = Suspended

Squad statistics

 Appearances and Points include (Super League, Challenge Cup and Play-offs) as of 4 September 2010.

Transfers

In

Out

References

2010 in rugby league by club
2010 in English rugby league
Catalans Dragons seasons